Liang, known in historiography as the Western Liang or the Later Liang, was an imperial dynasty of China during the Northern and Southern dynasties era of Chinese history. Throughout its existence, it remained a puppet state of the Western Wei, Northern Zhou and Sui dynasties. The Western Liang dynasty was ruled by members of the same imperial clan as the Liang dynasty. It was located in the middle Yangtze region in today's central Hubei province.

The Western Liang's founding emperor, Xiao Cha, was a grandson of the Liang dynasty founder Emperor Wu of Liang. As a result, Western Liang is usually considered a rump state of the Liang dynasty after 557. From 555 to 557 the two states claiming the political orthodoxy of the Liang dynasty existed simultaneously: Xiao Cha ruled from Jiangling, while Xiao Yuanming and Xiao Fangzhi ruled from Jiankang. Before 555, Emperor Yuan of Liang also ruled from Jiangling before he was captured and executed by Xiao Cha and his Western Wei backers. However, he is considered a Liang dynasty emperor rather than a Western Liang emperor because, among other things, he (at least nominally) controlled a much larger territory.

The Western Liang had 3 emperors, Xiao Cha (Emperor Xuan), Xiao Kui (Emperor Ming), and Xiao Cong (Emperor Jing). From 617 to 621, when the Sui dynasty collapsed, Xiao Cha's great-grandson Xiao Xian occupied the former Western Liang territory (and more) and proclaimed himself King of Liang, but his short-lived state is usually considered separate.

Emperors

References 

States and territories established in the 550s
States and territories disestablished in the 580s
Liang dynasty
587 disestablishments
Dynasties in Chinese history
Former countries in Chinese history
555 establishments
6th-century establishments in China
6th-century disestablishments in China
History of Hubei